Quantasomes are particles found in the thylakoid membrane of chloroplasts in which photosynthesis takes place. They are embedded in a paracrystalline array on the surface of thylakoid discs in chloroplasts. They are composed of lipids and proteins that include various photosynthetic pigments and redox carriers. For this reason they are considered to be photosynthetic units. They occur in 2 sizes: the smaller quantasome is thought to represent the site of photosystem I, the larger to represent the site of photosystem II.

Quantasomes were first identified by Roderic B. Park in 1962.
Each quantasome contains about 230-250 chlorophyll molecules and 50 molecules of carotenoids. Each quantasome forms two pigment systems, PS-I and PS-II, and thus are equipped for photochemical reactions (light reaction) of photosynthesis.

See also
Light-dependent reactions
Photophosphorylation
Photosynthetic reaction centre
Photosystem II
Thylakoid

References

Photosynthesis
Plant anatomy